Frank Edward Kane (born August 4, 1932) is a Canadian former politician. He served in the Legislative Assembly of New Brunswick from 1969 to 1982 as a Liberal member from the constituency of Chatham.

References

1932 births
Living people